Lewis Silkin LLP is a UK top 100 commercial law firm with offices in London, Oxford, Cardiff, Belfast, Dublin and Hong Kong. The firm has 60 partners, 173 lawyers and total staff of over 300 people. Michael Burd is Lewis Silkin's current Chair of the Partnership. Richard Miskella and Giles Crown are the firm's Joint Managing Partners.

History

The firm was established in 1950 in Rye Lane, Peckham as "Lewis Silkin and Partners" by John Silkin, son of Lewis Silkin. Lewis himself joined the practice full-time in the 1950s after leaving the House of Commons and relinquishing some parliamentary duties he had undertaken on first becoming a peer. Lewis Silkin opened an office in Westminster in addition to the existing office in Peckham. The Peckham office was initially a general practice, providing 'high street' services. The Westminster office specialised in planning law and development permits. During his time in Government and as Minister of Town and Country Planning, Lewis Silkin had been known as the 'architect' of our town and country planning policies.

The firm today

Lewis Silkin is based in London, Oxford, Cardiff, Belfast, Dublin and Hong Kong. The law firm focuses on two areas, and is divided as such:

 Employment, Immigration and Reward - acting for employers advising them on international employment, immigration and reward issues in addition to advising senior executives.; and 
 Creators, Makers and Innovators - acting for clients in the creative industries (such as advertising, marketing, media).

rockhopper

In 2014 Lewis Silkin launched a low cost, fixed fee employment law service "rockhopper" as a response to the potential loss of lawyers with caring responsibilities and client demand for cost-effective support. Lawyers working for rockhopper work flexibly from home on a part-time basis. rockhopper's operating model was noted by Working Families for its efforts in retaining staff in the legal industry with the service winning Best Innovation in the Working Families Best Practice 2018 awards.

International

The firm is a member of two international networks. Ius Laboris is a global alliance of employment law specialist firms and The Global Advertising Lawyers Alliance comprises experts internationally in that field.

Corporate social responsibility

The firm has taken part in charity fundraising events over the years, including the 3 Peaks Challenge in 2011, a 30-hour non-stop "Spinathon", staging a pantomime in 2012 and the 24 Peaks challenge in 2015.

In 2013, the firm took part in a charity shop takeover for Ty Hafan and cycle to Amsterdam for Helen and Douglas House.

In 2014, the firm organised an "alternative" triathlon to raise money for Oxford Homeless Pathways.

In 2014, the firm was awarded Best Social Mobility Program at the Managing Partners Forum awards.

The firm has been accredited by the Living Wage Foundation as a living wage employer since 2012.

See also
 Lewis Silkin, 1st Baron Silkin

External links
 
 Ius Laboris
 GALA

References 

Law firms based in London
English lawyers
1950 establishments in the United Kingdom
Organizations established in 1950